Malinxalchitl, meaning "beautiful flower of evil", (died 1524) was the Nahua queen regnant of Tzacoalco during the time of the Conquest of the Aztec Empire.

When Francisco Cortés de San Buenaventura arrived at Tzacoalco in 1524, he could not dominated its inhabitants, which were later persuaded by the Franciscan friars. Since most of Tzacoalco's original inhabitants had fled to Sayula, the overlord Juan de Escárena ordered the foundation of present-day Zacoalco de Torres with Méxica and Otomí families along with twelve Spaniards set to protect Queen Malinxalchitl. However, she was later killed by an arrow that impacted her heart, the presumable "punishment" by the Amerindians for having shown alliance to the Spanish.

References

See also
Martín Huitzingarit, cacique of Huitzquilic who also surrendered himself peacefully  to the Spanish.

Indigenous Mexicans
Queens regnant
16th-century women rulers
Indigenous Mexican women
Aztec Empire